Buffalo Hill may refer to:

Buffalo Hill, California, an unincorporated community in El Dorado County, California
Buffalo Hill (Hong Kong), a hill in Ma On Shan Country Park, Hong Kong